The Sindhudurg Express is a passenger train belonging to Konkan Railway that runs between Diva Junction and Sawantwadi Road. It is currently being operated with 10105/10106 train numbers on a daily basis.

Average speed and frequency 

The 10105/Sindhudurg Passenger runs with an average speed of 43 km/h and completes 465 km in 10h 45m. The 10106/Sindhudurg Passenger runs with an average speed of 40 km/h and completes 465 km in 11h 40m.

Route and halts 

The important halts of the train are:

 
 
 Apta
 Jite
  (Technical Halt) crew Change 
 
 
 
 
 
 
 
 
 
 
 
 
 Zarap

Coach composite 

The train has standard LHB rakes with max speed of 160 kmph. The train consists of 17 coaches:

 6 Second Sitting
 11General Unreserved
 2 Seating cum Luggage Rake

Traction

Both trains are hauled by a Bhusaval locoshed  based  WAP4 Electric locomotive from Sawantwadi to Diva and vice versa.

Rake Sharing 

The train shares its rake with 50107/50108 Sawantwadi Road - Madgaon Passenger and 50119/50120 Diva - Panvel Passenger.

See also 

 Sawantwadi Road railway station
 Diva Junction railway station
 Sawantwadi Road - Madgaon Passenger
 Diva - Panvel Passenger

Notes

References

External links 

 50105/Sindhudurg Passenger
 50106/Sindhudurg Passenger

Transport in Thane
Transport in Sawantwadi
Rail transport in Maharashtra
Slow and fast passenger trains in India
Railway services introduced in 1999
Konkan Railway